SSSP may refer to:

Technology
Samsung Smart Signage Platform, a smart TV
Single-source shortest paths; finding a path between two vertices in a graph, such that the  sum of the weights  is minimized

Entertainment
Sawaare Sabke Sapne... Preeto, an Indian television series

Learned societies
Society for the Study of Social Problems, a learned society dedicated to research in the social sciences
Society for the Scientific Study of Psychopathy, a learned society dedicated to studying psychopathy
Soil Science Society of Poland, a learned society dedicated to soil science research